The Southside Messenger is a local newspaper based in Keysville, Virginia, targeting several counties in Southside Virginia, including Charlotte, Lunenburg, and Prince Edward counties.

The paper issued its first copy on June 2, 2004. Since then, the paper has increased in circulation to nearly 3,000, passing several other newspapers in terms of circulation and now employing six people full-time.

References

External links 
 

Newspapers published in Virginia
2004 establishments in Virginia